The Burt Committee was a working party set up by the government of the United Kingdom during World War II to provide guidance on the housing shortage.

The committee had the correct title of the Interdepartmental Committee on House Construction. It was established in September 1942 by the Minister of Health, the Minister of Works and the Secretary of State for Scotland. The committee was briefed to consider which methods and materials would be most cost-effective and efficient for providing houses after war damage in The Blitz and slum clearance had left many homeless.

The committee favoured prefabricated housing as a solution to the problems, and their recommendations resulted in the Housing (Temporary Accommodation) Act 1944, which itself resulted in the Emergency Factory Made programme.

Sources 

 DTi Report on prefabricated buildings
 Brief history of government housing policy

Housing in the United Kingdom
Committees of the United Kingdom Cabinet Office